Przemysław Kazimierczak (born 22 February 1988) is a Polish football goalkeeper who plays for Zawisza Rzgów.

Club career
Kazimierczak began playing football at ŁKS Łódź's youth academy. In 2004, he joined Bolton Wanderers' academy. During the 2006–07 season he spent two months on loan at Accrington Stanley and played eight games before returning to Bolton. On 28 September 2007 he joined Wycombe Wanderers on a one-month loan.

On 31 January 2008 he joined Darlington on a free transfer signing an eighteen-month contract. He made his debut for Darlington on 3 May 2008, impressing with a clean sheet against already-promoted Peterborough United.
 
The first half of the 2008–09 season saw first team chances limited for Kazimierczak. Two appearances in the Football League Trophy were the only first team starts he made before December 2008. Ten days before Christmas he joined Whitby Town on loan.

On 28 March 2009 he replaced the injured Andy Oakes in the 79th minute of Darlington's match versus Barnet F.C. Due to Oakes' injury, Kazimierczak played in the remaining games of the season.

On 6 August 2009 he joined Oldham on a short-term contract.

On 8 August 2018, Kazimierczak joined KS Warta Sieradz. One year later, he signed with Zawisza Rzgów.

References

External links 
 
 

1988 births
Living people
Bolton Wanderers F.C. players
Accrington Stanley F.C. players
Wycombe Wanderers F.C. players
Darlington F.C. players
Whitby Town F.C. players
Oldham Athletic A.F.C. players
Flota Świnoujście players
KS Polkowice players
Jarota Jarocin players
Polonia Warsaw players
ŁKS Łódź players
Polish footballers
Polish expatriate footballers
Association football goalkeepers
English Football League players
Expatriate footballers in England
Polish expatriate sportspeople in England
Footballers from Łódź